City status is a symbolic and legal designation given by a national or subnational government. A municipality may receive city status because it already has the qualities of a city, or because it has some special purpose.

Historically, city status was a privilege granted by royal letters of patent. The status would allow markets and/or foreign trade, in contrast to towns. Sovereigns could establish cities by decree, e.g. Helsinki, regardless of what was in the location beforehand.  Also, with the establishment of federal governments, the new capital could be established from scratch, e.g. Brasília, without going through organic growth from a village to a town.

British city status was historically conferred on settlements with a diocesan cathedral; in more recent times towns apply to receive city status at times of national celebration. In the United States city can be used for much smaller settlements. 

The Government of China in 1982–1997 upgraded many counties to cities by decree, thereby increasing their city count from 250 to more than 650 during this period. Almost 15% of the counties in China became cities. The new "cities" may include large rural areas as well as urban areas. The upgrade was considered desirable by local governments because the new status provides additional powers of taxation and administration, the right to expand the size of government, and an increase in the proportion of land which could be converted from agriculture to buildings.

See also 
 City status in Belgium
 City status in Indonesia
 City status in Ireland
 City status in Sweden
 City status in the United Kingdom
 City rights in the Low Countries 
 Statutory city (Czech Republic)
 City with special status (Ukraine)
 Federal cities of Russia; City of federal subject significance
 Classification of Indian cities
Cities and new towns in Hong Kong
 Cities of Japan
 Cities of the Philippines
 List of cities in Alberta
 List of Israeli settlements with city status in the West Bank
 List of cities in Malta

References 

status
Populated places by type